Alloesia bicolor is a species of beetle in the family Cerambycidae. It was described by Waterhouse in 1880.

References

Heteropsini
Beetles described in 1880